Vukičević is a surname found in Croatia, Bosnia and Serbia. It may refer to:

 Ante Vukičević (born 1993), Croatian water polo player
 Branka Vukičević (born 1982), Croatian handball player
 Jelena Pavičić Vukičević (born 1975), Croatian politician
 Lazar Vukičević (1887–1941), Serbian typesetter, publicist and politician
 Perica Vukičević (born 1942), Croatian handball player
 Slaviša Vukičević (born 1962), Bosnian football player

See also
 Vukićević
 Vukčević

Bosnian surnames
Croatian surnames
Serbian surnames